The Sims Bustin' Out is a video game that was released in 2003/2004 for the PlayStation 2, Xbox, GameCube, Game Boy Advance and N-Gage. It is the second title in The Sims console series and the first The Sims title not released on Windows PC.

It featured the same 3D environment and engine the past game did, however adds several features from The Sims expansion packs: Livin' Large, House Party, Hot Date and Superstar. As the title suggests, Sims can get out of the house to visit other locations such as Shiny Things Lab or Casa Caliente. There are two modes: Bust Out Mode, which has mission-based gameplay and Freeplay Mode, which is open-ended gameplay very much like the original The Sims PC game. The PlayStation 2 version once featured the option to play online. However, it was shut down on August 1, 2008 (the same day The Sims Online shut down).

The Game Boy Advance and N-Gage version has its own storyline. The Game Boy Advance and Nintendo DS version of The Urbz: Sims in the City, released in 2004, serves as a sequel to this version.

Gameplay
In the console version, Malcolm Landgraab is going around his neighborhood, stealing items in return for unpaid rent. The player's objective is to complete each career track, unlock and buy back everyone's many possessions, and become rich enough to evict Malcolm from his mansion and move their own Sim in. Furnishing items are unlocked through the completion of different objectives. Aside from the objectives, gameplay is similar to previous Sims titles.

The Game Boy Advance and N-Gage version puts the player's Sim in "SimValley" for a summer holiday. Like the console version, GBA/N-Gage version gameplay is objective-based – every time the player completes a series of tasks, the game progresses. In this game, there are no furnishing objects to unlock. Instead, the player must complete all tasks to unlock new houses. Deviating from the "point-and-click" selection process used in every previous Sims title, this version allows the user to control their Sim directly, using the GBA's directional pad. In these versions, new mini-games (jobs for the Sims) are unlocked progressively when certain tasks are done. The GBA and N-Gage versions are largely the same, but the N-Gage version has an exclusive feature that allows Sims to collect three cartridges from various locations and play classic games such as Snake on the Sims' mobile phone.

In both versions, there are various locations that Sims may visit throughout the course of the game. As Sims advance through the game, new areas become accessible.

Online play
Exclusive to the PlayStation 2 version was a free online play called "Online Weekend" which was very similar to The Sims Online. This mode allowed players to participate in both freeplay and storymode with each other and chat using the USB keyboard on the PlayStation 2. The server for the game shut down on August 1, 2008, the same day The Sims Online was shut down, rendering the game impossible to play online.

Reception

The game received "favorable" reviews on all platforms according to the review aggregation website Metacritic. In Japan, where the Game Boy Advance and PlayStation 2 versions were ported for release under the game  on January 22, 2004, Famitsu gave it a score of one seven, one nine, and two eights for the latter; and one seven, one six, and two sevens for the former.

The Times gave the N-Gage version all five stars, saying, "The graphics are sublime, though this scaled-down version does have its limitations: there are, for example, no 'Simspeak' exchanges since the conversations are all text-based. Still, Bustin' Out should help to broaden the appeal of the nGage." The Village Voice gave the PlayStation 2 version a score of nine out of ten, saying, "The devil's in the details [...] mundane or fun, everything recedes into a heartbeat of flushing, snoring, and Simlish." The Cincinnati Enquirer gave the Game Boy Advance version a similar score of four-and-a-half stars out of five, saying, "There are more than 20 different locations in the game to unlock and visit."

The PlayStation 2 version received a "Platinum" sales award from the Entertainment and Leisure Software Publishers Association (ELSPA), indicating sales of at least 300,000 units in the UK.

References

External links

2003 video games
Electronic Arts games
Game Boy Advance games
Interactive Achievement Award winners
Life simulation games
N-Gage games
GameCube games
PlayStation 2 games
Social simulation video games
Bustin Out
Video games featuring protagonists of selectable gender
Video games scored by Jerry Martin
Video games with alternative versions
Xbox games
Multiplayer and single-player video games
Griptonite Games
Video games developed in the United States
Games with GameCube-GBA connectivity